Henderson Broomes (born 24 November 1968) is a Barbadian cricketer. He played in eleven List A matches for the Barbados cricket team from 1994 to 1999.

See also
 List of Barbadian representative cricketers

References

External links
 

1968 births
Living people
Barbadian cricketers
Barbados cricketers